The Astraea class was an eight ship class of protected cruisers built for the Royal Navy during the 1890s. The ships served on a number of foreign stations during their careers, particularly in the waters of the Indian and Pacific Oceans, and around the Cape of Good Hope. Already obsolete by the outbreak of the First World War, most continued to see service in a variety of roles, though rarely in a front line capacity. By the end of the war the majority were being used as training or depot ships, and they were soon sold out of the service and scrapped. However, one ship, was bought by the Marine Society and used as a training ship until 1940.

Design and construction

The eight ships were ordered under the provisions of the 1889 Naval Defence Act as an improved design of the precedings. They were to displace 1000 tons more than the Apollos, and were to have improved sea-keeping abilities, and heavier and better placed armament. The result was a design with a full length deck that gave a higher freeboard amidships, and placed the main armament higher on the superstructure. Though this made them drier ships, the design was criticised for being a larger and more expensive development of the Apollos, but without offering any substantial increase in armament, speed or endurance. The increased weight did however make them more seaworthy, and the design provided the basis for the development of future protected cruisers. The ships were built at several of the principal navy dockyards: three at Devonport, two at Pembroke, and one each at Sheerness, Chatham and Portsmouth.

Service
All eight ships spent at least some time on foreign stations, particularly in the Indian and Pacific Oceans, and despite their obsolescence, all but  went on to see service in a variety of roles during the First World War.  was the first ship to be launched, in late 1892. She served on the Pacific Station during the early part of her career, but was converted into a submarine depot ship in 1907. She spent the First World War serving in this role, and was sold for scrapping in 1920. Astraea served on the China Station and in the Indian Ocean, before joining the Grand Fleet at the Nore in 1912. She was paid off after the war and was sold in 1920. Cambrian served on the Australia Station and in the Indian Ocean, before returning to Britain in 1913 to be paid off and put up for sale. The outbreak of the First World War led to the navy retaining her and commissioning her as a stoker's training ship named Harlech in 1916. She was renamed Vivid in 1921 and was sold in 1923.

Charybdis spent most of her career in British waters, with occasional voyages to the Indian Ocean and Far East commands. She became part of the 12th Cruiser Squadron on the outbreak of war, but was damaged in a collision in 1915 and was laid up at Bermuda. Used for harbour service from 1917 she was converted to a mercantile vessel and loaned to a shipping firm in 1918. She was returned to the navy in 1920, sold in 1922 and broken up the following year.  also served in China and India, and was on the sale list on the outbreak of war. Retained for use as a depot ship, she was renamed Indus II in 1915 and was sold in 1922.  served on the Cape and West African station, until being laid up and finally sold in 1914, the first of the class to leave service.  served in British and East Indian waters in the pre-war period. She was particularly active off the East African and Egyptian coasts during the war, and was paid off and sold in 1920. HMS Hermione was the longest-lived of the class. Serving alternately in British waters and at the Cape, she was in reserve by the outbreak of war. She briefly became a guard ship at Southampton, but by 1916 she was serving as the headquarters for coastal motor launches and motor torpedo boats. Paid off in 1919 she was sold to the Marine Society in 1922 and was renamed Warspite. She was finally broken up in 1940.

Ships

Notes

References

External links

 
Cruiser classes
Ship classes of the Royal Navy